Lauren Ambrose (born ) is an American actress and singer. She performs in television, film, and on Broadway.

Ambrose had television roles as Claire Fisher in Six Feet Under (2001–2005), for which she was nominated for two Primetime Emmy Awards and won two Screen Actors Guild Awards, and as Jilly Kitzinger in Torchwood: Miracle Day (2011). Her film credits include In & Out (1997), Can't Hardly Wait (1998), Psycho Beach Party (2000), Sleepwalk with Me (2012), and Where the Wild Things Are (2009). She is the lead singer of the ragtime band Lauren Ambrose and the Leisure Class.

Ambrose portrayed the lead role of Eliza Doolittle in the Lincoln Center Theater revival of My Fair Lady on Broadway, for which she was nominated for the 2018 Tony Award for Best Actress in a Musical and won the 2018 Outer Critics Circle Award for Outstanding Actress in a Musical.

In 2019, Ambrose began starring as Dorothy Turner in the Apple TV+ psychological horror series Servant.

Early life
Lauren Ambrose was born in New Haven, Connecticut, in 1978 or 1979. She is the daughter of Frank D'Ambruoso, a caterer and Anne (née Wachtel), an interior designer. She is of Italian descent on her father's side, and German, English, and Irish on her mother's. Ambrose attended Choate Rosemary Hall, Wilbur Cross High School, High School in the Community, and the ACES Educational Center for the Arts in New Haven as part of the class of 1996. She is also a trained opera singer who studied voice and opera at the Boston University Tanglewood Institute.

Career

1992–1997: Career beginnings 
Ambrose began her career in New York theater, starring in the Off-Broadway play Soulful Scream of a Chosen Son at the Vineyard Theatre from August to September 1990. Her early career also included television appearances, most notably playing supporting guest roles on Law & Order, and a feature guest role on the show in the 1998 episode "Damaged" as Valerie Maxwell, a mentally-challenged young woman raped by a group of popular high school students. Her first film role was In & Out (1997).

1998–2005: Breakthrough and Six Feet Under
She had a prominent role in the high school comedy Can't Hardly Wait (1998). She was the ingenue lead, Florence "Chicklet" Forrest, in Psycho Beach Party (2000).

Ambrose began her role on Six Feet Under in early 2001. She was nominated for the Best Actress in a Supporting Role Emmy Award twice, following the 2002 and 2003 seasons of the critically acclaimed drama.

2006–2017: Broadway debut 
In 2006, Ambrose made her Broadway debut in the Lincoln Center Theater revival of Awake and Sing! In 2007, she appeared as Juliet in the Public Theater's Shakespeare in the Park performance of Romeo and Juliet at the Delacorte Theater in Central Park. She appeared as Ophelia in the 2008 performance of Hamlet for Shakespeare in the Park. Ambrose returned to Broadway in Exit the King (by Eugène Ionesco) at the Ethel Barrymore Theater on Broadway, opposite Geoffrey Rush and Susan Sarandon. Ambrose provided the voice of the monster KW in Where the Wild Things Are, which was released in 2009.
She also appeared in the 2009 Hallmark film "Loving Leah."

In 2011, Ambrose appeared in seven of the ten episodes of Torchwood: Miracle Day. She played Jilly Kitzinger, a "sweet-talking PR genius with a heart of stone who's just cornered the most important client of her career and maybe of all time". For her performance as Kitzinger, Ambrose received a Saturn Award nomination for Best Supporting Actress In Television.

Ambrose is the lead singer of Lauren Ambrose and the Leisure Class, a ragtime dixieland jazz band formed in 2009. They have performed several times at Joe's Pub and charity events.

2018–present: Broadway return & Servant 
Ambrose was set to play Fanny Brice in a 2012 Broadway-bound revival of Funny Girl directed by Bartlett Sher, but the production was indefinitely postponed due to financial concerns. In March 2018 Ambrose started appearing as Eliza Doolittle in a new Broadway revival of My Fair Lady directed by Sher, a performance for which she was nominated for the 2018 Tony Award for Best Actress in a Musical and won the 2018 Outer Critics Circle Award for Outstanding Actress in a Musical.

In October 2018, Ambrose left My Fair Lady to take on the lead role as Dorothy Turner in the thriller series Servant produced by M. Night Shyamalan and Tony Basgallop for Apple TV+. The series premiered in November 2019 and she has been starring in it since 2019.

Personal life
Ambrose has been married to professional writer Sam Handel since September 2001. They have two children.

Filmography

Film

Television

Video game

Stage

Awards and nominations

References

External links
 
 
 
 

1970s births
Year of birth missing (living people)
Living people
20th-century American actresses
21st-century American actresses
Actresses from New Haven, Connecticut
American film actresses
American people of English descent
American people of German descent
American people of Irish descent
American people of Italian descent
American Shakespearean actresses
American stage actresses
American television actresses
American voice actresses
Choate Rosemary Hall alumni
Tanglewood Music Center alumni
Wilbur Cross High School alumni